The 2000 NCAA men's volleyball tournament was the 31st annual tournament to determine the national champion of NCAA men's collegiate indoor volleyball. The single elimination tournament was played at the Allen County War Memorial Coliseum in Fort Wayne, Indiana during May 2000.

UCLA defeated Ohio State in the final match, 3–0 (15–8, 15–10, 17–15), to win their eighteenth national title. The Bruins (29–5) were coached by Al Scates.

UCLA's Brandon Taliaferro was named the tournament's Most Outstanding Player. Taliaferro, along with five other players, comprised the All-Tournament Team.

Qualification
Until the creation of the NCAA Men's Division III Volleyball Championship in 2012, there was only a single national championship for men's volleyball. As such, all NCAA men's volleyball programs, whether from Division I, Division II, or Division III, were eligible. A total of 4 teams were invited to contest this championship.

Tournament bracket 
Site: Allen County War Memorial Coliseum, Fort Wayne, Indiana

All tournament team 
Brandon Taliaferro, UCLA (Most outstanding player)
Angel Aja, Ohio State
Chris Fash, Ohio State
Colin McMillan, Ohio State
Seth Burnham, UCLA
Evan Thatcher, UCLA

See also 
 NCAA Men's National Collegiate Volleyball Championship
 NCAA Women's Volleyball Championships (Division I, Division II, Division III)

References

NCAA Men's Volleyball Tournament
NCAA Men's Volleyball Championship
NCAA Men's Volleyball Championship
Ncaa Mens Volleyball Tournament
Volleyball in Indiana